Żyrzyn  is a village in Puławy County, Lublin Voivodeship, in eastern Poland. It is the seat of the gmina (administrative district) called Gmina Żyrzyn.

The village has a population of 1,400.

See also
 Battle of Żyrzyn

References

Villages in Puławy County
Lublin Governorate
Lublin Voivodeship (1919–1939)